İmamqulubəyli is a village and municipality in the Aghjabadi Rayon of Azerbaijan. It has a population of 1,022.

References

Populated places in Aghjabadi District